Molène is an island off the west coast of Brittany and one of the Ponant Isles, making it the largest of an archipelago of twenty islands. In tiers of government it is in Finistère, a department of Brittany in north-western France – specifically at the heart of the commune of Île-Molène, which takes in neighbouring islets.

Geography
The community and port are on the east side, opposite a tiny tidal island, the Lédénes of Molène.

Population
Inhabitants of Île-Molène are called in French Molénais. Usual residents have fallen in recent decades, but Molène remains inhabited, with a permanent population of 169 (2013 census).

Amenities
The island's electricity is produced by a small diesel generator. Potable water supplies are from rainwater catchment, with each household additionally maintaining its own cistern.

A local delicacy is Molène sausage, which has the distinction of being smoked with seaweed.

Wreckage history
Per a repetitive old Breton proverb, "" ("Who sees Molène sees his pain/penalty /  who sees Ushant sees his blood / who sees Sein sees his end / who sees Groix sees his cross"). This proverb underlines local points being often deadly to navigate.

See also
Communes of the Finistère department
Parc naturel régional d'Armorique

References

External links

 Official website  
 

Islands of Brittany
Communes of Finistère
Populated coastal places in France